Winter Hall (21 June 1872 – 10 February 1947) was a New Zealand actor of the silent era who later appeared in sound films. He performed in more than 120 films between 1916 and 1938. Prior to that, he had a career as a stage actor in Australia and the United States. In sound films, he was frequently typecast as a clergyman.

Biography
Hall was born in Christchurch, New Zealand, and died in Los Angeles, California. Hall was married to fellow-New Zealander, Katherine Young, a concert pianist. Their Australian-born son, Desmond Winter Hall, was a science fiction writer, magazine editor, and the author of I Give You Oscar Wilde (1965), a novel about the nineteenth century dramatist and wit.

Filmography

 The Pioneers (1916) - Dan Farrell (film debut)
 The Joan of Arc of Loos (1916)
 The Gift Girl (1917) - Usun Hassan
 The Bronze Bride (1917) - Mr. Carter
 Sacrifice (1917) - Stephen Stephani
 The Primrose Ring (1917) - Dr. Ralph MacLean
 A Romance of the Redwoods (1917) - John Lawrence, Uncle To Jenny
 The Spindle of Life (1917) - James Bradshaw
 The Cricket (1917) - Pinglet
 The Silent Lady (1917) - Philemon
 My Little Boy (1917) - Uncle Oliver
 New Love for Old (1918) - Ben Sawyer
 The Kaiser, the Beast of Berlin (1918) - Dr.Von Gressler
 Beauty in Chains (1918) - Don Cayetano
 The House of Silence (1918) - Dr. Henry Rogers
 Rich Man, Poor Man (1918)
 The Bravest Way (1918) - Moreby Nason
 Missing (1918) - Dr. Howson
 The Firefly of France (1918) - Dunham
 The City of Dim Faces (1918) - Brand Matthews
 Till I Come Back to You (1918) - King Albert
 The Vanity Pool (1918) - Uncle Penny
 Hitting the High Spots (1918) - Morgan Randolph
 The Squaw Man (1918) - Fletcher
 The Mystery Girl (1918) - Prince Sebasatian
 The Dub (1919) - Burley Hadden
 Alias Mike Moran (1919) - Mr. Vandecar
 The Turn in the Road (1919) - Reverend Matthew Barker
 Captain Kidd, Jr. (1919) - John Brent
 The Money Corral (1919) - Gregory Collins
 For Better, for Worse (1919) - Doctor
 The Red Lantern (1919) - Rev. Alex Templeton
 The Hushed Hour (1919) - Judge Robert
 The Right to Happiness (1919) - Henry Forrester
 Why Smith Left Home (1919) - The General
 When Bearcat Went Dry (1919) - Lone Stacy
 A Girl in Bohemia (1919) - McMain, Publisher
 The Beauty Market (1919) - Ashburton Gaylord
 The Woman Thou Gavest Me (1919)
 The Thirteenth Commandment (1920) - Roger Kip Sr.
 The Tree of Knowledge (1920) - Siur Mostyn Hollingsworth
 The Forbidden Woman (1920) - Edward Harding
 Faith (1920) - Adam Harden
 The Deadlier Sex (1920) - Henry Willard
 Alias Jimmy Valentine (1920) - William Lane
 The Third Woman (1920) - Judson Halliday
 The Woman in His House (1920) - Hilda's Father, Andrew Martin
 Behold My Wife! (1920) - General Armour
 Hearts Are Trumps (1920) - Lord Altcar
 The Jucklins (1921) - General Lundsford
 Forbidden Fruit (1921) - Minor Role (uncredited)
 The Breaking Point (1921) - Dr. Hillyer
 What Every Woman Knows (1921) - Charles Venables
 The Little Clown (1921) - Colonel Beverley
 The Witching Hour (1921) - Judge Prentice
 The Child Thou Gavest Me (1921) - Her Father
 The Affairs of Anatol (1921) - Dr. Johnston (uncredited)
 The Great Impersonation (1921) - Duke of Oxford
 Her Social Value (1921) - Shipley
 Cheated Hearts (1921) - Nathanial Beekman
 Saturday Night (1922) - The Professor
 Burning Sands (1922) - Governor
 On the High Seas (1922) - John Deveraux
 Skin Deep (1922) - Dr. Langdon
 East Is West (1922) - Mr. Benson
 Wasted Lives (1923) - Dr. Wentworth
 The Voice from the Minaret (1923) - Bishop Ellsworth
 Little Church Around the Corner (1923) - Doc
 Ashes of Vengeance (1923) - The Bishop
 Her Reputation (1923) - John Mansfield
 The Day of Faith (1923) - Bland Hendricks
 Thundering Dawn (1923) - The Elder Standish
 Name the Man (1924) - Gov. Stanley
 Secrets (1924) - Dr. Arbuthnot
 The Right of the Strongest (1924) - Austin Lee Sr.
 The Turmoil (1924) - Henry Vertrees
 The Only Woman (1924) - William Brinnsley
 Husbands and Lovers (1924) - Robert Stanton
 The Boomerang (1925) - Gordon
 Raffles, the Amateur Cracksman (1925) - Lord Amersteth
 The Girl Who Wouldn't Work (1925) - District Attorney
 Graustark (1925) - Ambassador
 Compromise (1925) - Joan's Father
 Free to Love (1925) - Judge Orr
 The Pleasure Buyers (1925) - General Ripley
 Ben-Hur (1925) - Joseph
 Paradise (1928) - Rev. Cranston
 The Forger (1928) - John Leith
 After the Verdict (1929) - Lord Dartry
 High Seas (1929) - Lord Bracklethorpe
 Kitty (1929) - John Furnival
 The Wrecker (1929) - Sir Gerald Bartlett
 Woman to Woman (1929) - Dr. Gavron
 The Racketeer (1929) - Mr. Chapman
 The Love Parade (1929) - Priest (uncredited)
 The Lost Zeppelin (1929) - Mr. Wilson
 Road to Paradise (1930) - Brewster - the Butler
 Passion Flower (1930) - Leroy Pringle
 Girls Demand Excitement (1931) - The Dean
 Confessions of a Co-Ed (1931) - Dean Winslow
 Tomorrow and Tomorrow (1932) - President Adee
 The Strange Case of Clara Deane (1932) - Minister (uncredited)
 The Man Called Back (1932) - Judge
 Madame Racketeer (1932) - Minister (uncredited)
 Cavalcade (1933) - Minister on the Pulpit (uncredited)
 The Monkey's Paw (1933) - Mr. Hartigan
 Professional Sweetheart (1933) - Minister (uncredited)
 The World Moves On (1934) - Minister (uncredited)
 The Barretts of Wimpole Street (1934) - Clergyman (uncredited)
 Judge Priest (1934) - Judge Floyd Fairleigh (uncredited)
 British Agent (1934) - Cabinet Member (uncredited)
 The Pursuit of Happiness (1934) - Uncle (uncredited)
 The Merry Widow (1934) - Priest (uncredited)
 What Every Woman Knows (1934) - Cabinet Member (uncredited)
 Mills of the Gods (1934) - Bevins
 Don't Bet on Blondes (1935) - Minister at Wedding (uncredited)
 The Crusades (1935) - Archbishop (uncredited)
 Rendezvous (1935) - Chaplain (uncredited)
 Mutiny on the Bounty (1935) - Chaplain (uncredited)
 A Tale of Two Cities (1935) - Aristocrat (uncredited)
 The Invisible Ray (1936) - Minister (uncredited)
 The Bohemian Girl (1936) - Servant (uncredited)
 Champagne Charlie (1936) - Board Member (uncredited)
 The Crime of Dr. Forbes (1936) - Faculty Doctor (uncredited)
 Mary of Scotland (1936) - Minor Role (uncredited)
 Two in a Crowd (1936) - Judge (uncredited)
 Lloyd's of London (1936) - Dr. Beatty (uncredited)
 Slave Ship (1937) - Minister
 Bulldog Drummond's Revenge (1937) - Ferry Captain (uncredited)
 The Toast of New York (1937) - Board of Directors Member (uncredited)
 Four Men and a Prayer (1938) - Judge
 If I Were King (1938) - Major Domo

References

External links

1872 births
1947 deaths
New Zealand male film actors
New Zealand male silent film actors
New Zealand emigrants to the United States
People from Christchurch
20th-century New Zealand male actors
20th-century American male actors